Jerry Kenneth Martin (born August 18, 1950) is an American former ski jumper. He competed in the normal hill and large hill at the 1972 and 1976 Olympics and placed 27th–36th.

In September 1971, Martin  lost the right eye in an accident. Yet he won the national ski jumping title in 1971, 1973, and 1975, and competed at the 1970 and 1974 world championships. In 1971 he set the Pine Mountain jump record at 345 feet (105 m).

References

1950 births
Living people
American male ski jumpers
Olympic ski jumpers of the United States
Ski jumpers at the 1972 Winter Olympics
Ski jumpers at the 1976 Winter Olympics